Cape Klovstad is a rugged rock point between Colbeck Bay and Protection Cove in the southern part of Robertson Bay, Victoria Land, Antarctica. It was first charted by the British Antarctic Expedition, 1898–1900, under C.E. Borchgrevink, who named the feature for Dr. Herlof Klovstad, Medical Officer of the expedition.

References

Headlands of Victoria Land
Pennell Coast